Dr. Alan Eric Thompson (16 September 1924 – 18 February 2017) was a British Labour Party politician. Educated at the University of Edinburgh, he received a Ph.D. in economics in 1953. He served as Member of Parliament for Dunfermline Burghs from 1959 to 1964.

References

External links 
 

1924 births
2017 deaths
Scottish Labour MPs
Members of the Parliament of the United Kingdom for Fife constituencies
UK MPs 1959–1964